Dimaprit is a histamine analog working as a selective H2 histamine receptor agonist.

References

Biogenic amines
Amidines
Thioethers